Bayah may refer to:

Bay'ah, Islamic terminology
Bayah, Afghanistan
Bayah, Iran
Bayah, Philippine Highlands Rice Wine, also known as Tapuy

See also
Baya (disambiguation)
Bayas